The Larson–Miller parameter is a means of predicting the lifetime of material vs. time and temperature using a correlative approach based on the Arrhenius rate equation. The value of the parameter is usually expressed as LMP = T(C + log t), where C is a material specific constant, often approximated as 20, t is the time in hours, and T is the temperature in kelvins.

Creep-stress rupture data for high-temperature creep-resistant alloys are often plotted as log stress to rupture versus
a combination of log time to rupture and temperature. One of the most common time–temperature parameters used to present this kind of data is the Larson–Miller (L.M.) parameter, which in generalized form is

where
T = temperature, K or °R,
 = stress-rupture time, h,
C = constant, usually of order 20.

According to the L.M. parameter, at a given stress level the log time to stress rupture plus a constant of the order of 20 multiplied by the temperature in kelvins or degrees Rankine remains constant for a given material.

References
 F. R. Larson & J. Miller, Transactions ASME, Vol. 74, p. 765–771, 1952.
 G. E. Fuchs, High Temperature Alloys, Kirk-Othmer Encyclopedia of Chemical Technology.
 Smith & Hashemi, Foundations of Material Science and Engineering.
 G. E. Dieter, Mechanical Metallurgy, Third Edition, McGraw-Hill Inc., 1986, p. 461–465, .

See also
 Larson–Miller relation
 Creep (deformation)

Materials science